Alatəmir or Alatemur or Alatemir or Alateymur may refer to:
Böyük Alatəmir, Azerbaijan
Kiçik Alatəmir, Azerbaijan
Alateymur, Iran